Diospyros domarkind is a species of flowering plant in the ebony and persimmon family Ebenaceae, native to Colombia. Preferring to grow in wet tropical areas, it is a tree reaching  with pinkish bark.

References

domarkind
Endemic flora of Colombia
Plants described in 1999